The 2001 Chrono des Herbiers was the 20th edition of the Chrono des Nations cycle race and was held on 21 October 2001. The race started and finished in Les Herbiers. The race was won by Jean Nuttli.

General classification

References

2001
2001 in road cycling
2001 in French sport
October 2001 sports events in France